Tetracha oxychiliformis is a species of tiger beetle that was described by W. Horn in 1897, under a name that was preoccupied, so a replacement name was therefore given in 1905.

References

Beetles described in 1897
Cicindelidae